Rupert John McDonald (17 March 1910 – 6 November 1969) was an Australian rules footballer who played with Geelong in the Victorian Football League (VFL).

McDonald was a half-back from Winchelsea, who played as a flanker in Geelong's 1931 premiership team. The 1931 VFL Grand Final was one of 10 finals that McDonald played during his seven-season career and he also played in a losing grand final the previous year. From 1930 to 1933 he put together 49 games in a row and played his 100th league match in Geelong's preliminary final loss to South Melbourne in 1934.

References

External links
 
 

1910 births
Australian rules footballers from Victoria (Australia)
Geelong Football Club players
Geelong Football Club Premiership players
1969 deaths
One-time VFL/AFL Premiership players